Loango National Park is a national park in western Gabon. It protects diverse coastal habitats, including part of the  Iguéla Lagoon, the only significant example of a typical western African lagoon system that is protected within a national park.

Situated between the Nkomi and Ndogo Lagoons, Loango National Park is considered one of the best spots on Africa's western coast. The naturalist, Mike Fay, called Loango "Africa's Last Eden", and this is where Michael "Nick" Nichols from National Geographic took his well-known pictures of surfing hippopotamuses. Both men call Loango the 'Land of surfing hippos'. The park spans  of savanna, beach, forest, and mangroves. Loango National Park offers extensive panoramas and the opportunity to observe elephants, buffalos, hippopotamuses, gorillas and leopards venturing onto the white sand beaches.

After South Africa, the world's largest concentration and variety of whales and dolphins can be found right off the Loango coast. Loango is renowned worldwide as a site for tarpon of record size, as well as many other large saltwater fish.

The World Conservation Union or International Union for the Conservation of Nature and Natural Resources (IUCN) classed Loango National Park as a faunal reserve and protected area for conservation.

History
In 1956, the first regional faunal reserves were created in and around Loango National Park to promote sustainable use of the area’s wildlife and wildlands. In November 2002, President Omar Bongo Ondimba created 13 new national parks in Gabon, putting the country firmly on the map. Altogether, the 13 parks created represent 10% of the landmass of Gabon, one of them being Loango National Park. Very few villages currently exist within the park, as most are located on the opposite bank of the Ngove Lagoon. As such, the park is nearly devoid of people and home only to a vast and spectacular array of terrestrial, avian and marine wildlife. While some of these animals inhabit specific ecological niches to which they have been adapting over time immemorial, others such as elephants and buffalos range across several landscapes.

Tourism and conservation
Rombout Swanborn, a pioneering Dutch investor in "Conservation Tourism", developed SCD (Société de Conservation de Developpement). Research, park management and educational activities are performed in partnership with WCS. He also created Africa's Eden, developing the infrastructure and logistics to provide high-end nature tourism experiences in remote parts of Gabon (and from 2006 in São Tomé and Príncipe) as well, based on the concept "Tourism pays for Conservation".

People
The human inhabitants of the Loango area remain dependent on the natural resources that surround them for their daily needs. Today, although some Gabonese citizens have migrated toward the urban centres or taken up employment within modern industries, such as oil and timber production, most individuals living in traditional villages still depend heavily upon their natural surroundings for their day-to-day needs.

Village-dwelling peoples use a slash-and-burn agricultural technique and grow several domesticated plant species, including manioc, peanuts, and mustard greens. Women are responsible for most of the gardening, save for the preliminary felling and clearing of trees and bush. Men make their living by fishing or hunting. Fishermen use long nets, throw nets, gill nets, long lines, baited hooks, fish traps and spears to catch fish and shrimp. Land crabs are caught by hand. Traditional hunting gear such as bows and arrows, spears, deadfall and spring traps have been replaced by high-caliber rifles and shotguns. Several other food products are harvested wild in the forest, savannah, or from the beaches, such as turtle eggs.

Images

References

External links 
 Wildlife Conservation Society
Virtual Tour of the National Parks
 

National parks of Gabon
Protected areas established in 2002
2002 establishments in Gabon
Ogooué-Maritime Province